Charles "Specs" Wright (September 8, 1927 - February 6, 1963) was an American jazz drummer born in Philadelphia.

Wright played drums in an Army band until his discharge in 1947. Following this he played in a group with Jimmy Heath and Howard McGhee. In 1949 he joined Dizzy Gillespie's band alongside John Coltrane, remaining until it disbanded in mid-1950. Later in 1950 he was a member of Gillespie's sextet with Coltrane, Jimmy Heath, Percy Heath, and Milt Jackson. In the 1950s, Wright played with Earl Bostic, Kenny Drew, Cannonball Adderley, Art Blakey, and Carmen McRae, and gigged locally in Philadelphia. He was with Hank Mobley in 1958 with his septet alongside Billy Root, Curtis Fuller, Ray Bryant, Tommy Bryant, and Lee Morgan. Following this Wright played with Sonny Rollins, Betty Carter, Red Garland, Coleman Hawkins, and Lambert, Hendricks and Ross. He died in 1963. He was interred in Beverly National Cemetery in Beverly, New Jersey.

Discography
With Cannonball Adderley
In the Land of Hi-Fi with Julian Cannonball Adderley (EmArcy, 1956)
With Nat Adderley
To the Ivy League from Nat (EmArcy, 1956)
With Art Blakey
Drum Suite (Columbia, 1957)
Orgy in Rhythm (Blue Note, 1957)
With Ray Bryant
Ray Bryant Trio (Prestige, 1957)
With Betty Carter
Out There (Peacock, 1958)
With Kenny Drew
Kenny Drew and His Progressive Piano (Norgran, 1953–54)
With Red Garland
Coleman Hawkins with the Red Garland Trio (Swingville, 1959) - with Coleman Hawkins
Satin Doll (Prestige, 1959 [1971])
Red Garland at the Prelude (Prestige, 1959)
Lil' Darlin' (Status, 1959)
Red Garland Live! (New Jazz, 1959)
With Hank Mobley, Curtis Fuller, Lee Morgan and Billy Root
Monday Night at Birdland (Roulette, 1958)
Another Monday Night at Birdland (Roulette, 1959)
With Sonny Rollins
Sonny Rollins and the Big Brass (MetroJazz, 1958)

References
[ Specs Wright] at Allmusic

1927 births
1963 deaths
American jazz drummers
Musicians from Philadelphia
20th-century American drummers
American male drummers
Jazz musicians from Pennsylvania
20th-century American male musicians
American male jazz musicians
Burials at Beverly National Cemetery